Iain Thornley (born 11 September 1991) is an English rugby league footballer who plays as a  and er for the Wigan Warriors in the Betfred Super League.

He previously played for the Wigan Warriors in the Super League, and on loan from Wigan at the South Wales Scorpions in Championship 1, Leigh and Workington Town in the Championship and the Salford Red Devils in the Super League. Thornley has also played for Hull Kingston Rovers and the Catalans Dragons in the top flight.

Between 2009 and 2012 Thornley played rugby union with the Sale Sharks and Leeds Carnegie.

Background
Thornley was born in Wigan, Greater Manchester, England.

Career
Signed to Wigan as a teenager he was selected for the England Academy side but at age 18, he switched codes to Rugby Union to join Sale Sharks.  After two seasons Thornley rejoined Wigan on a three-year contract.
He played in the 2013 Challenge Cup Final victory over Hull F.C. at Wembley Stadium.
He played in the 2013 Super League Grand Final victory over the Warrington Wolves at Old Trafford.

Wigan (re-join)
On 17 November 2021, it was reported that he had signed for Wigan Warriors in the Super League
On 28 May 2022, he played for Wigan in their 2022 Challenge Cup Final victory over Huddersfield.

References

External links

Catalans Dragons profile
SL profile

1991 births
Living people
Catalans Dragons players
English rugby union players
English rugby league players
Hull Kingston Rovers players
Leeds Tykes players
Leigh Leopards players
Rugby league fullbacks
Rugby league centres
Rugby league players from Wigan
Rugby league wingers
Rugby union players from Wigan
Rugby union wings
Sale Sharks players
South Wales Scorpions players
Wigan Warriors players